

13001–13100 

|-
| 13001 Woodney || 1981 VL || Laura M. Woodney (born 1970), American astronomer at Lowell Observatory || 
|-id=003
| 13003 Dickbeasley || 1982 FN || Richard ("Dick") E. Beasley (1934–1992) was a noted calligrapher and multi-media artist. A teacher and administrator at Northern Arizona University, Flagstaff, Beasley was in demand for workshops and symposia worldwide and garnered numerous commissions || 
|-id=004
| 13004 Aldaz || 1982 RR || Luis Aldaz (born 1925), meteorologist and scientific leader at Amundsen–Scott and Byrd Station in Antarctica during 1959–1964. Mount Aldaz, in Marie Byrd Land, was named for him by ACAN, the Advisory Committee on Antarctic Names || 
|-id=005
| 13005 Stankonyukhov ||  || Stanislav Nikolaevich Konyukhov (born 1937), Ukrainian satellite and launch vehicle designer || 
|-id=006
| 13006 Schwaar ||  || Pierre-Yves Schwaar (1946–2000), Swiss amateur optician and telescope maker, member of the Saguaro Astronomy Club of Phoenix, AZ || 
|-id=009
| 13009 Voloshchuk ||  || Yuri Voloshchuk (born 1941), Ukrainian radioastronomer and professor at the Kharkov University || 
|-id=010
| 13010 Germantitov ||  || Gherman Titov (1935–2000), Russian pilot-cosmonaut and cosmologist || 
|-id=011
| 13011 Loeillet ||  || Jean-Baptiste Loeillet of London (1680–1730), Belgian composer of baroque music || 
|-id=014
| 13014 Hasslacher ||  || Marian Brasseau Hasslacher (1901–1997) and Charles Alfred (Carl) Hasslacher (1897–1973), maternal grandparents of the discoverer. || 
|-id=015
| 13015 Noradokei || 1987 XC || Noradokei is a clock tower handmade by Hatakenaka Genma in 1897 at Aki city, Kochi prefecture, when clocks were still new to Japan. People working on the nearby fields were able to tell precise times from this clock. It is preserved as the city's cultural symbol. || 
|-id=017
| 13017 Owakenoomi || 1988 FM || Owakenoomi was a ruler of north Musashi in the latter half of the fifth century. The leader of a troop of guardsmen of the Emperor Yuuryaku, he was buried in the Inariyama old burial mounds in Gyodashi, Saitama prefecture, with an iron sword inlaid with gold that is now a national treasure || 
|-id=018
| 13018 Geoffjames || 1988 GF || Geoffrey K. James (born 1956), Deputy manager for earth sciences at JPL. || 
|-id=024
| 13024 Conradferdinand ||  || Conrad Ferdinand Meyer (1825–1898), Swiss poet and historical novelist || 
|-id=025
| 13025 Zürich || 1989 BA || Zürich, Switzerland || 
|-id=027
| 13027 Geeraerts ||  || Jef Geeraerts (Jozef Adriaan Geeraerts; 1930–2015), Flemish author || 
|-id=028
| 13028 Klaustschira ||  || Klaus Tschira (1940–2015), German billionaire and cofounder of SAP AG || 
|-id=031
| 13031 Durance ||  || Durance river, in southeastern France || 
|-id=032
| 13032 Tarn ||  || Tarn river, in southern France || 
|-id=033
| 13033 Gardon ||  || Gardon or Gard river, in southern France, an affluent of the Rhône || 
|-id=037
| 13037 Potosi ||  || Potosi, a famous mining town in Bolivia, was founded in 1546. During 1556–1783 almost 45~000 tons of pure silver were mined from the Cerro Rico, with 7000 tons going to the Spanish monarchy. Thousands of Incan workers died from exhaustion and mercury poisoning. They were replaced by African slaves || 
|-id=038
| 13038 Woolston ||  || Thomas Woolston (1669–1731), an English deist. || 
|-id=039
| 13039 Awashima ||  || Awashima Island, Niigata prefecture, in the Sea of Japan. || 
|-id=044
| 13044 Wannes ||  || Wannes van de Velde (1937–2008) was a Flemish singer, musician and poet. He sang his rebellious songs in the local dialect of Antwerp, a choice that was not always appreciateid by the city's intelligentia. His song Ik wil deze nacht in de straten verdwalen ("This night I want to stray through the city") became popular || 
|-id=045
| 13045 Vermandere ||  || Willem Vermandere (born 1940), a Flemish singer of countryside songs, performs in the colorful West Flemish dialect "Westhoek". Although barely understood by his fellow countrymen, he is esteemed for his critical views on society, the church and World War I. His song Blance and his horse is well known || 
|-id=046
| 13046 Aliev ||  || Shamil' Gimbatovich Aliev (born 1943) is a Russian specialist in the field of applied mathematics and naval design || 
|-id=049
| 13049 Butov ||  || Anatolij Sergeevich Butov (born 1939), an expert in the field of computing in transport economics. || 
|-id=052
| 13052 Las Casas ||  || Bartolome de Las Casas (1474–1565), a Catholic priest who fought for the rights of the Indians and against the military conquest of the New World. || 
|-id=053
| 13053 Bertrandrussell ||  || British philosopher and mathematician Bertrand Russell (1872–1970) was one of the twentieth century's premier logicians and author with A. N. Whitehead of Principia Mathematica. Also known for his antiwar activism, humanitarian ideals and freedom of thought, he was awarded the Nobel Prize for Literature in 1950 || 
|-id=055
| 13055 Kreppein ||  || Wolfgang Kreppein (born 1948) is a German physician and dermatologist. || 
|-id=057
| 13057 Jorgensen ||  || Carl Jorgensen, Canadian amateur astronomer || 
|-id=058
| 13058 Alfredstevens ||  || Alfred Stevens (1823–1906) was a Belgian painter with a preference for portraying graceful female subjects, e.g., Salomè (1888). His impressionist friends envied him for his successful paintings, but his style was too realistic for him to be considered an impressionist || 
|-id=059
| 13059 Ducuroir ||  || Marc Ducuroir (1932–2003), Belgian amateur astronomer, secretary of the Société Royale Belge d'Astronomie || 
|-id=062
| 13062 Podarkes || 1991 HN || Podarkes, son of Ares and full brother of Protesilaos, led the Achaians and took 40 black ships to the Trojan war. || 
|-id=063
| 13063 Purifoy || 1991 LB || Dana D. Purifoy (born 1955), a pilot in the Flight Crew Branch of NASA's Dryden Flight Research Center, Edwards, California. || 
|-id=064
| 13064 Haemhouts ||  || Ben Haemhouts (born 1972) is a Belgian conductor, trombonist and composer, who studied during 1999–2002 with the Russian conductor A. Polyanichko. Currently he is the director of the Belgian Chamber Philharmonic Orchestra, and his performance of Mendelssohn's Italian Symphony in Oct. 2009 was much appreciated || 
|-id=069
| 13069 Umbertoeco ||  || Umberto Eco (1932–2016) was an Italian philosopher and novelist, well known for his novels Il nome della rosa (1980) and Il pendolo di Foucault (1988). He was the president of the Scuola Superiore di Studi Umanistici at the University of Bologna || 
|-id=070
| 13070 Seanconnery ||  || Sean Connery (1930–2020), Scottish film actor || 
|-id=077
| 13077 Edschneider ||  || Edward T. Scheider (born 1948) serves as a staff pilot and T-38 instructor pilot at NASA's Johnson Space Center in Houston, Texas. || 
|-id=079
| 13079 Toots ||  || Jean-Baptiste, Baron ("Toots") Thielemans (born 1922) is a Belgian jazz harmonica player who worked with Charlie Parker, Ella Fitzgerald, Billy Joel and others || 
|-id=082
| 13082 Gutiérrez ||  || Pedro J. Gutiérrez (b.~1972) of the Instituto de Astrofísica de Andalucía—Consejo Superior de Investigaciones Cientificas in Granada, Spain, has used thermophysical modeling to study the evolution of comets and their orbits || 
|-id=084
| 13084 Virchow ||  || Rudolf Virchow, German pathologist || 
|-id=085
| 13085 Borlaug ||  || Norman Ernest Borlaug (1914–2009), a U.S. agronomist and a central figure in the "green revolution", collaborated for many years with Mexican scientists on the development of new wheat varieties. In 1970 he received the Nobel Peace Prize and subsequently pursued efforts to eliminate hunger in Asia and Africa || 
|-id=086
| 13086 Sauerbruch ||  || Ferdinand Sauerbruch (1875–1951), a German surgeon who devised many improvements in surgical procedures, including the so-called pressure-difference procedure in thoracic surgery. He devised artificial limbs that move voluntarily after amputation by using the muscles of the stump. || 
|-id=087
| 13087 Chastellux ||  || François-Jean de Chastellux (1734–1788), author of De la félicité publique (1757), was a founder of the social sciences. He sought to determine whether society is susceptible to amelioration, if not to perfection. He cited America as an example of man's ability to progress through liberty, reason and equality. || 
|-id=088
| 13088 Filipportera ||  || Filippo Portera (born 1955), a Sicilian composer of electronic music. || 
|-id=092
| 13092 Schrödinger ||  || Erwin Schrödinger (1887–1961), Austrian physicist, born in Vienna, who founded wave mechanics in 1926. Later he worked in relativistic quantum mechanics, the theory of gravity and unified field theory. Together with Dirac, he received the 1933 Nobel prize in physics. || 
|-id=093
| 13093 Wolfgangpauli ||  || Wolfgang Pauli (1900–1958), Austrian physicist, born in Vienna, was co-founder of quantum theory. He discovered the Pauli principle, which explains the level structure of atoms. He received the 1945 Nobel prize in physics. || 
|-id=094
| 13094 Shinshuueda ||  || Ueda area of Nagano prefecture, Japan, called Shinshu and surrounded by the 2000-metre-high mountains of Joshin-etsu highland national park || 
|-id=096
| 13096 Tigris ||  || The Tigris river, which flows south from the mountains of southeastern Turkey through Iraq and empties itself into the Persian Gulf || 
|-id=097
| 13097 Lamoraal ||  || Lamoral, Count of Egmont (1522–1568), was a Flemish nobleman. Together with William of Orange and the Count of Hoorne he protested against the Spanish Inquisition. His life, capture and execution were memorialized in Goethe's play Egmont, with music by Beethoven to accompany its first performance in 1810 || 
|}

13101–13200 

|-
| 13101 Fransson ||  || Claes Fransson (born 1951), a professor in astronomy at Stockholm University.  || 
|-id=109
| 13109 Berzelius ||  || Jöns Jacob Berzelius (1779–1848), a Swedish chemist who discovered the chemical law of constant proportions in 1828. This led to the development of the modern system of chemical notation. Berzelius is also credited with identifying the chemical elements silicon, selenium, thorium and cerium || 
|-id=111
| 13111 Papacosmas ||  || Constantine Papacosmas (born 1939), Canadian amateur astronomer † || 
|-id=112
| 13112 Montmorency ||  || Philip de Montmorency, Count of Horn (1524–1568), was stadtholder of Guelders and an admiral of Flanders. Together with William of Orange and the Count of Egmont, he resisted the introduction of the Spanish Inquisition in the Netherlands. He and Egmont were condemned to death and beheaded in Brussels || 
|-id=113
| 13113 Williamyeats ||  || William Butler Yeats (1865–1939) an Irish poet and recipient of the Nobel prize for literature in 1923. He was known for his highly artistic form that gave expression to the spirit of a whole nation. On his grave in County Sligo is the advice "Cast a cold Eye On life, on death. Horseman, pass by!" || 
|-id=114
| 13114 Isabelgodin ||  || Isabel Godin des Odonais (Isabel de Casa Mayor, 1728–1792) was the wife of Jean Godin des Odonais, a technician of the La Condamine expedition in Peru. In order to join her husband, who had left for La Cayenne, she had to make her way through the Amazon forest, losing all her travel companions and fighting against sickness and hunger || 
|-id=115
| 13115 Jeangodin ||  || Jean Godin des Odonais (1713–1792) was the nephew of Louis Godin, one of the members of the La Condamine expedition in Peru. In May 1736 he joined the expedition and married Isabel de Casa Mayor, an heiress from a very wealthy family. Back in France he composed a grammar for the quichua language || 
|-id=116
| 13116 Hortensia ||  || Hortensia is the name of a flower (Hydrangea hortensia) introduced to France by the astronomer Le Gentil on his return from observing the transits of Venus in India. Although he originally proposed to name this flower Pautia, either name would honor the orbit computer Nicole-Reine Etable de la Briere Hortense Lepaute. || 
|-id=117
| 13117 Pondicherry ||  || Pondicherry is a city on the Coromandel coast in southeast India, founded by the French in 1674. In 1760 the astronomer Le Gentil traveled there to observe the transits of Venus in 1761 and 1769. Today the city is a popular destination for tourists. || 
|-id=118
| 13118 La Harpe ||  || Jean François de La Harpe (1739–1803), a French writer || 
|-id=121
| 13121 Tisza ||  || Tisza River is a major tributary of the Danube river, with its source in the Carpathian Mountains. The Tisza flows through a small portion of Ukraine and then into Hungary. The river has recently been heavily polluted by cyanide, endangering its fauna. || 
|-id=122
| 13122 Drava ||  || Drava River is a major tributary of the Danube river. It flows from its source in the Italian Alps, through the Austrian federal states of Tirol and Kärnten. Huns and Slavs invaded the Alpine countries through its valley. || 
|-id=123
| 13123 Tyson || 1994 KA || Neil deGrasse Tyson (born 1958), American astrophysicist and educator. Director of New York City's Hayden Planetarium. || 
|-id=125
| 13125 Tobolsk ||  || Tobolsk is a Russian city in western Siberia, at the confluence of the Irtysh and Tobol rivers. Founded in 1587, it became a major center of early Russian colonization in Siberia. In 1761, astronomer Chappe d´Auteroche successfully observed the transit of Venus there. || 
|-id=126
| 13126 Calbuco ||  || Calbuco volcano, is a strato volcano in southern Chile. || 
|-id=127
| 13127 Jeroenbrouwers ||  || Jeroen Brouwers (born 1940), an Indonesian-born Dutch writer, who has won many literary prizes. || 
|-id=128
| 13128 Aleppo ||  || Aleppo, a city in Syria which, since the 2nd century BC, is at the crossroad of several trade roads and still reflects the rich culture of its successive occupants. || 
|-id=129
| 13129 Poseidonios ||  || Poseidonios (c. 135 BCE-c. 51 BCE), a Greek Stoic philosopher, astronomer and geographer. He was celebrated as a polymath who attempted to create a unified system for understanding human intellect and the universe, which would provide an explanation for human behavior. || 
|-id=130
| 13130 Dylanthomas ||  || Dylan Marlais Thomas (1914–1953), a Welsh neo-romantic poet and writer. || 
|-id=131
| 13131 Palmyra ||  || Palmyra, an ancient Semitic city, was first mentioned in the early second millennium BC as a caravan stop for travelers in the Syrian Desert. || 
|-id=132
| 13132 Ortelius ||  || Abraham Ortelius (1527–1598), a Flemish cartographer and geographer. || 
|-id=133
| 13133 Jandecleir ||  || Jan Decleir (born 1946), a Flemish movie and stage actor. || 
|-id=140
| 13140 Shinchukai ||  || Shinchukai is the name of the alumni association of Shingu Middle School, Wakayama prefecture. The school was founded in 1901 and was succeeded by Shingu High School in 1948. Haruo Sato (poet and novelist, 1892–1964) and Takeo Hatanaka (astronomer, 1914–1963) were among the members || 
|-id=145
| 13145 Cavezzo ||  || Cavezzo, a small town in northern Italy. || 
|-id=146
| 13146 Yuriko ||  || Yuriko Okuni, wife of the discoverer. || 
|-id=147
| 13147 Foglia ||  || Sergio Foglia (born 1972), an Italian amateur astronomer and discoverer of minor planets. He is an AAVSO member and the secretary of the Minor Planets Section of the Italian Astrophile Union. Src || 
|-id=149
| 13149 Heisenberg ||  || Werner Heisenberg (1901–1976), a German theoretical physicist, co-founder of quantum theory who formulated the uncertainty principle. He worked in nuclear physics and cosmic radiation and tried to define a unified field theory. He also explained sociopolitical problems in popular publications. He received the Nobel prize for physics in 1932. || 
|-id=150
| 13150 Paolotesi || 1995 FS || Paolo Tesi (born 1959), elder son of Italian amateur astronomer Luciano Tesi who co-discovered this minor planet. || 
|-id=151
| 13151 Polino || 1995 OH || Polino, a typical village with about 250 inhabitants, is the smallest municipality in Italy. || 
|-id=154
| 13154 Petermrva || 1995 RC || Peter Mrva (born 1962) Czech astronomer who was one of the first to help building the Astronomical Observatory of Modra. During years of mostly manual labor he taught, helped to explain and inspired the second discoverer in some areas, including astronomy and computer graphics. || 
|-id=156
| 13156 Mannoucyo ||  || Mannoucyo is the name of a new town in Kagawa prefecture on Shikoku island. It was formed from the merging of the three towns Mannoucho, Kotonamicho and Chunancho. The new town has approximately 900 small reservoirs, including Mannou Pond for irrigation, the largest irrigation pond in Japan || 
|-id=157
| 13157 Searfoss ||  || Richard A. Searfoss (1956–2018), an American astronaut who served as a research pilot at NASA's Dryden Flight Research Center, Edwards, California. He is a veteran of three space flights, having been pilot on Space Shuttle missions STS-58 and STS-76 and commander on STS-90. || 
|-id=162
| 13162 Ryokkochigaku ||  || Ryokkochigaku is the nickname of the Yokohama Midorigaoka High School earth-science club, known for its research of whale fossils and observation of solar prominences. || 
|-id=163
| 13163 Koyamachuya ||  || Chuya Koyama (born 1978), a Japanese cartoonist, who created Ucyu Kyodai ("Brothers Fascinated by Cosmos"), a scientific comic featuring the universe and the future. He has won numerous awards. || 
|-id=168
| 13168 Danoconnell || 1995 XW || Daniel O'Connell, astronomer and core member at the Air Force Maui Optical and Supercomputing observatory || 
|-id=174
| 13174 Timossi ||  || Aldo Timossi, a promoter of conventions, workshops and scientific meetings related to the advancement of planetary and minor planet study and also of the IMPACT Project (International Monitoring Program for Asteroid and Comet Threat). || 
|-id=176
| 13176 Kobedaitenken ||  || Kobedaitenken, short for Kobe-Daigaku Tenmon Kenkyu-kai ("Kobe University astronomy club"), to which the second discoverer belonged during his student days. || 
|-id=177
| 13177 Hansschmidt ||  || Hans Schmidt (1923–2003) German co-founder of the Hoher List Observatory together with Friedrich Becker (1900–1990). Schmidt was specialized in the observation and reduction of eclipsing stars. Later, he became general director of the Bonner Universitäts-Sternwarte. || 
|-id=178
| 13178 Catalan ||  || Eugène Charles Catalan (1814–1894) was a French-Belgian mathematician, known in particular for the "Catalan numbers". His left-wing convictions caused him to be expelled from the Ecole Polytechnique in Paris. In 1865 the University of Liège honored him with the chair of Analysis || 
|-id=179
| 13179 Johncochrane ||  || John Dundas Cochrane (1780–1825) was a Scottish explorer who during 1820–1823 crossed on foot from Russia to Kamchatka. His remarkable journey has been described in A pedestrian journey through Russia and Siberian Tartary, to the frontiers of China, the Frozen Sea and Kamtchatka (1829) || 
|-id=180
| 13180 Fourcroy ||  || Antoine-François de Fourcroy (1755–1809), French chemist and co-founder of the École polytechnique || 
|-id=181
| 13181 Peneleos ||  || Peneleos, leader of Boeotia, killed by Eurypylus, is said to have been one of those inside the wooden horse. || 
|-id=184
| 13184 Augeias ||  || Augeias, the legendary king of Elis, father of Agasthenes and grandfather of Polyxenos. Allusion is made to the exploit of Hercules cleaning his stables. || 
|-id=185
| 13185 Agasthenes ||  || Agasthenes, son of legendary king Augeias from Greek mythology. || 
|-id=188
| 13188 Okinawa ||  || Okinawa, the southwesternmost prefecture in Japan, has a complicated history and beautiful sea and islands. The Okinawa Tracking and Communication Station of the Japan Aerospace Exploration Agency is located on a hill to conduct command operations and receive telemetry from satellites that observe the earth or the moon || 
|-id=192
| 13192 Quine ||  || Willard Van Orman Quine (1908–2000), American logician and philosopher, was initially trained in mathematics and became a professor of philosophy at Harvard University (1936–1978). He was a prolific scholar whose contributions range from mathematical logic to a constructivist analysis of philosophy. || 
|-id=196
| 13196 Rogerssmith ||  || Rogers E. Smith (born 1936) served as the Chief of the Flight Crew Branch at NASA's Dryden Flight Research Center, Edwards, California, where he also flew as project pilot for a number of NASA research aircraft. || 
|-id=197
| 13197 Pontecorvo || 1997 DC || Bruno Pontecorvo, a student of Enrico Fermi and the first to theorize the neutrino oscillation that produces three different particles. || 
|-id=198
| 13198 Banpeiyu || 1997 DT || Banpeiyu (Citrus Banpeiyu) is a large, round, yellow citrus fruit that is a specialty of Kumamoto prefecture. The largest known example was collected in 2005 and weighed 4.858 kg || 
|-id=200
| 13200 Romagnani ||  || Sauro Romagnani (born 1942), an Italian teacher at the San Marcello junior high school, was selected to participate in a research teaching team for the Educational European Center. He contributed to the founding of the local public library and establishment of the Astronomical Observatory in the Pistoia area. || 
|}

13201–13300 

|-id=206
| 13206 Baer ||  || James J. Baer (born 1965), a member of the Faculty of Mathematics at South University. || 
|-id=207
| 13207 Tamagawa ||  || Tamagawa, located in the eastern part of Ehime prefecture, is home of Tamagawa Junior High School. || 
|-id=208
| 13208 Fraschetti ||  || George Fraschetti (born 1941), a technical advisor and contributor to the NEAT instruments. || 
|-id=209
| 13209 Arnhem ||  || Arnhem, a name derived from the presence of eagles, is a city near the Rhine river in the eastern part of the Netherlands. It is famous for archaeological evidence of human activity there in the Stone Age, some 70~000 years ago || 
|-id=211
| 13211 Stucky ||  || Mark P. Stucky (born 1958) served as a NASA research pilot at the Johnson Space Center, Houston, Texas, instructing Space Shuttle astronauts in the T-38 and the Gulfstream-II Shuttle Training Aircraft, and at the Dryden Flight Research Center, Edwards, California. || 
|-id=212
| 13212 Jayleno ||  || Jay Leno (born 1950) is an American television personality || 
|-id=213
| 13213 Maclaurin ||  || Colin Maclaurin (1698–1746), a Scottish mathematician known for his "Taylor adapted series", which he used for adding powers of arithmetic progressions. He is particularly honored for his Treatise of Fluxions (1742), in which he presented for the first time Newton's methods on this subject || 
|-id=214
| 13214 Chirikov ||  || Aleksei Chirikov (1703–1748) was a Russian navigator who in 1741 discovered and reached the coast of Alaska, during the "great Northern Expedition". He also discovered some of the Aleutian islands and took part in creating a general map of the Russian discoveries in the Pacific Ocean || 
|-id=217
| 13217 Alpbach ||  || Alpbach, an Austrian mountain village situated in the Tyrolean Alps, hosts the annual Summer School Alpbach. It is also famous for the international congress European Forum Alpbach, organized there every summer since 1945 to provide an important platform for economists, scientists, politicians and artists || 
|-id=219
| 13219 Cailletet ||  || Louis Paul Cailletet (1832–1913), a French physicist who was the first to liquefy oxygen, nitrogen, hydrogen and other gases. Liquefied nitrogen is used by astronomers to refrigerate imaging detectors to reduce thermal background noise and make faint minor planets detectable. || 
|-id=220
| 13220 Kashiwagura ||  || Mitsuru Kashiwagura (born 1950), a Japanese amateur astronomer and high school teacher in Ooe, Yamagata prefecture. He has been observing occultations since 1994. || 
|-id=221
| 13221 Nao || 1997 OY || Naomi Nakamura (born 1965), whose nickname is Nao, is the wife of the discoverer, Akimasa Nakamura. || 
|-id=222
| 13222 Ichikawakazuo ||  || Kazuo Ichikawa (born 1955) is a postman and the associate president of the Nanyo Astronomical Club since 1988. || 
|-id=223
| 13223 Cenaceneri ||  || The Ash Wednesday Supper, is a philosophical work by Giordano Bruno that was published in 1584, in which, for the first time in Western philosophical thought, there is discussion of the infinity of worlds in the universe. || 
|-id=224
| 13224 Takamatsuda ||  || Takashi Matsuda, Japanese primary-school teacher and amateur astronomer. || 
|-id=225
| 13225 Manfredi ||  || Eustachio Manfredi (1674–1739), and his brothers Gabriele (1681–1761) and Eraclito (1682–1759), were professors at the University of Bologna, of astronomy, mathematics and medicine-cum-geometry. Eustachio was the author of the famous Istituzioni astronomiche, published as the second volume of his works. || 
|-id=226
| 13226 Soulié || 1997 SH || Guy Soulié (born 1920) made photometric observations of the zodiacal light, measured positions of comets, planets and their satellites and wrote astrometric reduction programs. A member of the Hipparcos Input Catalog team, he also discovered double stars and minor planets. || 
|-id=227
| 13227 Poor ||  || Kim Poor (born 1952), an American astronomical artist known for his use of brilliant colors and dramatic scenery. He founded NovaSpace Galleries, which promotes space art and provides a focused outreach to the public for the genre || 
|-id=229
| 13229 Echion ||  || Echion from Greek mythology, one of the Achaean warriors who entered Troy in the wooden horse —but who died when jumping down from it || 
|-id=231
| 13231 Blondelet ||  || Jacques Blondelet (1934–1998) was a former president of the Société Lorraine d´Astronomie and vice president of the Observatoire Provençal d´Astrophotographie. || 
|-id=234
| 13234 Natashaowen ||  || Natalya Cherkassova Owen (born 1952) is Honorary Consul General of the Russian Federation in Hawaii. She has developed humanitarian missions to Eastern Russia, establishing a nonprofit foundation that is building a rehabilitation center near Vladivostok for children with cancer. || 
|-id=235
| 13235 Isiguroyuki ||  || Nobuyuki Ishiguro (born 1959), a Japanese amateur astronomer has been active in the Nanyo Astronomical Amateurs Club since 1984. || 
|-id=238
| 13238 Lambeaux ||  || Jef Lambeaux (1852–1908), a Belgian sculptor who belonged to the Van Beers Clique, a group of young and eccentric artists. || 
|-id=239
| 13239 Kana || 1998 KN || Kana Nakamura (born 1999), whose initials are "KN", is the daughter of the discoverer. || 
|-id=240
| 13240 Thouvay ||  || Jacqueline Thouvay (born 1939), manager of the Laboratoire d´Etudes Spatiales et d´Instrumentation en Astrophysique at Paris Observatory. || 
|-id=241
| 13241 Biyo ||  || Josette Biyo (born 1958), a Filipino high school teacher who received the Intel International Excellence in Teaching Award during the ISEF in 2002 † || 
|-id=244
| 13244 Dannymeyer ||  || Danny Meyer (born 1958), restaurateur and philanthropist, promotes neighborhood rejuvenation of historic New York City buildings and parks. Meyer is a board leader of two charities focusing on feeding the hungry and is a winner of the Share Our Strength Humanitarian Award and the James Beard Humanitarian Award || 
|-id=248
| 13248 Fornasier ||  || Sonia Fornasier (born 1972), Italian astronomer at Padua Observatory . She studies the physical properties of cis-Jovian and trans-Neptunian objects and was involved in the development of the Rosetta mission imaging system. || 
|-id=249
| 13249 Marcallen ||  || Marc Allen (born 1951) is a stellar and solar astronomer who has directed the Space Studies Board of the U.S. National Research Council (1991–1999) and is currently Assistant Associate Administrator for Strategic and International Planning at NASA. || 
|-id=250
| 13250 Danieladucato || 1998 OJ || Daniela Ducato (born 1960), an active Italian amateur astronomer, has organized many astronomical public events and observing gatherings in Sardinia. She also designed the public gardens of Guspini, her native town, following themes that resembled the constellations. || 
|-id=251
| 13251 Viot || 1998 OP || Hervé Viot (born 1961) built the CCD camera used for the ODAS survey. He was also involved in many other aspects of the telescope software and hardware. His work and competence were invaluable to the success of the project. He is now involved in other projects at the Observatoire de la Côte d´Azur. || 
|-id=253
| 13253 Stejneger ||  || Leonhard Hess Stejneger (1851–1943) was a Norwegian-born American ornithologist and author of more than 400 scientific publications on birds, reptiles and seals. During a visit to Bering Island he became fascinated by the life of G. W. Steller, about whom he wrote a biography in 1936 || 
|-id=254
| 13254 Kekulé ||  || Friedrich August Kekulé (1829–1896), a German chemist, who, in 1865, discovered the structure of benzene as a six-membered ring of carbon atoms with alternating single and double bonds. || 
|-id=256
| 13256 Marne ||  || The Marne is a river in France with its source on the Langres plateau. With a length of nearly 525 km it runs generally in a north-northwest direction, passing the cities of Chaumont and Chalôns-sur-Marne. Below the city of Reims it changes its direction to continue its path to Paris, where it enters the Seine river || 
|-id=258
| 13258 Bej ||  || Gautam Ashim Bej (born 1989), 2002 DCYSC finalist. He attended the Altamont School, Birmingham, Alabama. || 
|-id=259
| 13259 Bhat ||  || Nivedita Bhat (born 1988), 2002 DCYSC finalist. She attended the Arvida Middle School, Miami, Florida. || 
|-id=260
| 13260 Sabadell ||  || The Agrupació Astronòmica de Sabadell celebrated its 40th anniversary on 14 April 2000. It is the most important amateur astronomical society in Spain. The discoverers, Ferrán Casarramona and Antoni Vidal, belong to this society. || 
|-id=265
| 13265 Terbunkley ||  || Terrance S. Bunkley (born 1987), 2002 DCYSC finalist. He attended the Dunbar Middle School, Fort Worth, Texas. || 
|-id=268
| 13268 Trevorcorbin ||  || Trevor Eugene Corbin (born 1988), 2002 DCYSC finalist. He attended the Harry F. Byrd Middle School, Richmond, Virginia. || 
|-id=269
| 13269 Dahlstrom ||  || Kurt Martin Dahlstrom (born 1988), 2002 DCYSC finalist. He attended the Hillsboro High School, Hillsboro, North Dakota. || 
|-id=272
| 13272 Ericadavid ||  || Erica Elizabeth David (born 1989), 2002 DCYSC finalist. She attended the Pinedale Middle School, Pinedale, Wyoming. || 
|-id=274
| 13274 Roygross ||  || Roy James Gross (born 1987), 2002 DCYSC finalist. He attended the Penndale Middle School, Lansdale, Pennsylvania. || 
|-id=278
| 13278 Grotecloss ||  || Kristin Shannon Grotecloss (born 1988), 2002 DCYSC finalist. She attended the Southside Fundamental Middle School, St. Petersburg, Florida. || 
|-id=279
| 13279 Gutman ||  || Jennifer Erin Gutman (born 1989), 2002 DCYSC finalist. She attended the Mt. De Chantal Visitation Academy, Wheeling, West Virginia. || 
|-id=280
| 13280 Christihaas ||  || Christine Haas (born 1988), 2002 DCYSC finalist. She attended the Reyburn Intermediate School, Clovis, California. || 
|-id=281
| 13281 Aliciahall ||  || Alicia Esther Hall (born 1988), 2002 DCYSC finalist. She attended the Valley High School, Hoople, North Dakota. || 
|-id=283
| 13283 Dahart ||  || David Andrew Hart (born 1990), 2002 DCYSC finalist. He attended the Episcopal Day School, Lake Charles, Louisiana. || 
|-id=285
| 13285 Stephicks ||  || Stephanie Marie Hicks (born 1990), 2002 DCYSC finalist. She attended the Keystone Junior High School, San Antonio, Texas. || 
|-id=286
| 13286 Adamchauvin ||  || Christiane Adam Chauvin (born 1952), of Paris Observatory, is responsible for research relationships with the European Community. || 
|-id=293
| 13293 Mechelen ||  || Mechelen, a Belgian city near Antwerp, was settled on the banks of the Dyle river in Gallic-Roman times. In 1303 it became the first seller of wool, and by the late Middle Ages it was a center of the cloth trade. Famous for its St. Rombout tower and Dordoens botanical garden, Michelen is known today for the cultivation of endive, asparagus and cauliflower || 
|-id=294
| 13294 Rockox ||  || Nicolaas II Rockox (1560–1640), a humanist and maecenas, of Flemish nobility in the Spanish Netherlands. He was a highly respected citizen in Antwerp. A graduate of law from the University of Douai, he became one of the burgomasters of Antwerp in 1603, a position which he held several times. || 
|-id=298
| 13298 Namatjira ||  || Albert Namatjira (1902–1959), landscape painter. || 
|}

13301–13400 

|-id=302
| 13302 Kezmoh ||  || Lorren J. Kezmoh (born 1990), 2002 DCYSC finalist. She attended the Brentwood Middle School, Pittsburgh, Pennsylvania. || 
|-id=303
| 13303 Asmitakumar ||  || Asmita Kumar (born 1988), 2002 DCYSC finalist. She attended the Goleta Valley Junior High School, Goleta, California. || 
|-id=305
| 13305 Danielang ||  || Daniel Owen Lang (born 1988), 2002 DCYSC finalist. He attended the Independence Home School, Yardley, Pennsylvania. || 
|-id=315
| 13315 Hilana ||  || Hilana Megan Lewkowitz-Shpuntoff (born 1988), 2002 DCYSC finalist. He attended the Paul W. Bell Middle School, Miami, Florida. || 
|-id=316
| 13316 Llano ||  || Rayden Llano (born 1988), 2002 DCYSC finalist. || 
|-id=319
| 13319 Michaelmi ||  || Michael Mi (born 1988), 2002 DCYSC finalist. He attended the Andrew W. Mellon Middle School, Pittsburgh, Pennsylvania. || 
|-id=320
| 13320 Jessicamiles ||  || Jessica Lian Miles (born 1988), 2002 DCYSC finalist. She attended the Keystone Junior High School, San Antonio, Texas. || 
|-id=325
| 13325 Valérienataf ||  || Valérie Nataf Lambert (born 1959) is a well-known French TV news journalist who covers major international events. The name was suggested by M. A. Barucci and M. Fulchignoni. || 
|-id=326
| 13326 Ferri ||  || Francesca Ferri, a planetary scientist at the University of Padua.  || 
|-id=327
| 13327 Reitsema ||  || Harold Reitsema (born 1948), of Ball Aerospace, Boulder, has been a participant in many of the successful occultation expeditions to determine sizes and shapes of minor planets, and he has also used occultations to study planetary atmospheres. The name was suggested by M. F. A'Hearn. || 
|-id=328
| 13328 Guetter ||  || Harry Hendrik Guetter (born 1935) was an astronomer at the United States Naval Observatory Flagstaff Station from 1964 until 2002. The name was suggested by C. B. Luginbuhl. || 
|-id=329
| 13329 Davidhardy ||  || David A. Hardy (born 1936), a pioneering British astronomical artist whose work has appeared in numerous books and magazines, as well as on stage and in film. His own books include Visions of Space and The Fires Within. || 
|-id=330
| 13330 Dondavis ||  || Don Davis (born 1952) is an American astronomical artist who got his start working on some of the first modern lunar maps with the United States Geological Survey. His attention to detail is recognized by his fellow artists. He has also contributed to books and films, including the PBS series Cosmos. || 
|-id=332
| 13332 Benkhoff ||  || Johannes Benkhoff (born 1961) is a planetary scientist at the German Aerospace Center (DLR) in Berlin-Adlerhof. His research is in the field of modeling cometary nuclei, in preparation for space missions like Rosetta and Contour. He was instrumental in organizing the ACM 2002 conference. The name was suggested by G. Hahn. || 
|-id=333
| 13333 Carsenty ||  || Uri Carsenty (born 1949) is an Israeli planetary scientist working at the German Aerospace Center (DLR) in Berlin-Adlerhof. He works on the development of cameras and electronics for planetary space mission. He has been the brains and heart behind the organisation of ACM 2002. The name was suggested by G. Hahn. || 
|-id=334
| 13334 Tost ||  || Wilfried Tost (born 1952) is a system manager at the German Aerospace Center (DLR) in Berlin-Adlerhof. He has a keen interest in astronomy, and is active at Wilhelm Förster Sternwarte in Berlin. He was instrumental in organizing the ACM 2002 conference. The name was suggested by G. Hahn. || 
|-id=335
| 13335 Tobiaswolf ||  || Tobias Wolf (born 1980) is an enthusiastic naked-eye observer of the moon, planets and other wonders of the sky. || 
|-id=346
| 13346 Danielmiller ||  || Daniel Louis Miller Jr. (born 1988), 2002 DCYSC finalist. He attended the Frick International Studies Academy, Pittsburgh, Pennsylvania. || 
|-id=350
| 13350 Gmelin ||  || Johann Georg Gmelin (1709–1755) was a German naturalist who was appointed professor of chemistry and natural history at the University of St. Petersburg in 1731. From 1733 to 1743 he traveled through Siberia and his investigations were recorded in Flora Sibiria (1749–1750) and Reise durch Sibirien (1753). || 
|-id=351
| 13351 Zibeline ||  || Zibeline is the name of a small animal (Martes zibellina), that generally lives in the colder parts of the globe. Astronomer Chappe d´Auteroche, on his voyage to Tobolsk, Siberia, in 1761, reported how it has been hunted for its beautiful dark fur, resulting in almost complete extinction. || 
|-id=352
| 13352 Gyssens ||  || Marc Gyssens (born 1959) is a researcher on databases. A life-long commitment to the popularization of science, especially astronomy, led to his appointment as director of the public observatory Urania (near Antwerp). In 1988, he co-founded the International Meteor Organization. || 
|-id=357
| 13357 Werkhoven ||  || Margaretha Cornelia Maria Werkhoven, a Dutch-Surinamese botanist at the National Herbarium of Suriname. || 
|-id=358
| 13358 Revelle ||  || Douglas ReVelle (1945–2010), was an American meteorologist and meteor physicist at Los Alamos National Laboratory. His pioneering theoretical work include meteor physics and astronomy based on theoretical aerodynamics, meteor acoustics and the interpretation of infrasonic meteor observations. The name was suggested by Z. Ceplecha. || 
|-id=365
| 13365 Tenzinyama ||  || Tenzinyama, a mountain in the western part of Iwamuro village, Niigata prefecture. || 
|-id=367
| 13367 Jiří ||  || Jirí Borovicka (born 1964), of the Astronomical Institute of the Academy of Sciences of the Czech Republic, is known for his work in meteor physics and astronomy, particularly in meteor spectroscopy. He discovered the low- and high-temperature components of meteor radiation. || 
|-id=368
| 13368 Wlodekofman ||  || Wlodek Kofman (born 1945) directs the Laboratoire de Planétologie at the Université Joseph Fourier, Grenoble. He is principal investigator on the Rosetta mission's CONSERT experiment, which will use the transmission of radio waves through the nucleus of comet 46P/Wirtanen to build up a three-dimensional image. || 
|-id=370
| 13370 Júliusbreza || 1998 VF || Július Breza (1917–1991) was one of the foremost otolaryngologists in Czechoslovakia. He was the head of the otolaryngology division at the Puerile Faculty hospital in Bratislava. His work centered on endoscopic procedures to treat disorders of the bronchi and lung in children. || 
|-id=376
| 13376 Dunphy ||  || Desmond Plunket Dunphy, an Irish medical doctor. || 
|-id=380
| 13380 Yamamohammed ||  || Yahya Maqsood Mohammed (born 1988), 2002 DCYSC finalist. He attended the C.W. Ruckel Middle School, Niceville, Florida. || 
|-id=387
| 13387 Irus ||  || The mythological Greek beggar Irus defied and, in the presence of Penelope's suitors, was defeated by Ulysses on his return to Ithaca. || 
|-id=389
| 13389 Stacey ||  || Stacey Ward McClusky (born 1959), wife of American astronomer John V. McClusky, who discovered this minor planet. || 
|-id=390
| 13390 Bouška ||  || Jiří Bouška (born 1925), a Czech astronomer and emeritus professor at Charles University in Prague, studied interplanetary matter and for 30 years served as the editor of the magazine Říše hvězd (The Realm of Stars, see ) and the Czech Astronomical Yearbook. He taught several generations of Czech astronomers, including one of the discoverers. || 
|-id=395
| 13395 Deconihout ||  || Serge Deconihout is a French amateur astronomer who applies his skills to telescope construction. He is the founder Valmeca, a company at the Haute Provence Observatory that produces large telescopes for both amateurs and professionals. || 
|-id=396
| 13396 Midavaine ||  || Thierry Midavaine is vice-president of the Association Française d'Astronomie. A dedicated observer, he is also a skilled optic-electronics engineer. For many years he has helped amateur astronomers improve their observations by using image-intensifier tubes. || 
|}

13401–13500 

|-id=403
| 13403 Sarahmousa ||  || Sarah S. Mousa (born 1987), 2002 DCYSC finalist. She attended the Engle Middle School, West Grove, Pennsylvania. || 
|-id=404
| 13404 Norris ||  || Noele Rosalie Norris (born 1988), 2002 DCYSC finalist. She attended the George Washington Carver Middle School, Miami, Florida. || 
|-id=405
| 13405 Dorisbillings ||  || Doris Billings, née Dora Kawchuk, mother of the discoverer † || 
|-id=406
| 13406 Sekora ||  || Ondrej Sekora (1899–1967), Czech journalist, cartoonist, illustrator and writer. || 
|-id=408
| 13408 Deadoklestic ||  || Dea Doklestic (born 1982), a geophysicist and atmospheric scientist, is the wife of the first discoverer. This minor planet is being named on the occasion of their wedding on 2009 June 21 || 
|-id=410
| 13410 Arhale ||  || Alan R. Hale (born 1941) joined with Tom Johnson in the mid–1960s in the creation and development of the Schmidt-Cassegrain telescope and its ultimate production. In this he was instrumental in bringing astronomy to many schools and ordinary people over the years || 
|-id=411
| 13411 OLRAP ||  || OLRAP, the Orchestre Lyrique de Région Avignon Provence, was established in Avignon in 1982. The discoverer chose this name also to honor his wife, Marie-Françoise, who plays timpani in this orchestra. || 
|-id=412
| 13412 Guerrieri ||  || Mary Guerrieri (born 1966) has supported astronomical research at the University of Arizona. She served as an editor of the university Press Space Science Series, manager of the Lunar and Planetary Laboratory's Space Imagery Center and manager of Academic Affairs for the Department of Planetary Sciences || 
|-id=413
| 13413 Bobpeterson ||  || Robert ("Bob") Peterson (born 1949), a graduate of the University of Arizona, was assistant director at the Steward Observatory and for over 26 years, has been responsible for U. of A. operations in the Catalinas, on Kitt Peak, the Vatican Observatory on Mt. Graham, and for the U. of A. aluminizing facility || 
|-id=414
| 13414 Grantham ||  || James Grantham (born 1966) is the observatory operations supervisor at the Steward Observatory Mt. Lemmon Station. He played a vital role defending the telescopes at both Mt. Lemmon and Mt. Bigelow during the 2002 Bullock and 2003 Aspen wildfires. He enjoys working on his family's ranch near Arivaca, Arizona || 
|-id=415
| 13415 Stevenbland ||  || Steven Bland (born 1967) is a member of the Mountain Operations team for Steward Observatory at the University of Arizona. || 
|-id=416
| 13416 Berryman ||  || Jay Berryman (born 1980) is a member of the Mountain Operations team for Steward Observatory at the University of Arizona. || 
|-id=421
| 13421 Holvorcem ||  || Paulo R. Holvorcem (born 1967), a Brazilian mathematician who has developed new numerical methods for simulating waves in rotating fluids and in free space. Since 1996 he has been observing near-earth objects and developing software that efficiently allocates telescope time during automated observations. || 
|-id=423
| 13423 Bobwoolley ||  || Robert Woolley (born 1953) taught astronomy and was planetarium director at Montgomery College (1976–1981) and president of the Von Braun Astronomical Society (1993–1994). Since 1994 he has been conducting week-long astronomical/geological educational experiences at a dark site near Flagstaff, Arizona. || 
|-id=424
| 13424 Margalida ||  || Margalida Rechac (born 1959) is the wife of Spanish astronomer Ángel López Jiménez, who co-discovered this minor planet. || 
|-id=425
| 13425 Waynebrown ||  || Since 1993 Wayne Brown (born 1957) has developed and makes widely available CCD imaging systems for the astronomical and biomedical communities. He has also designed and built CCD cameras used for imaging from space. || 
|-id=433
| 13433 Phelps ||  || Kels Gordon Phelps (born 1988), 2002 DCYSC finalist. He attended the East Middle School, Butte, Montana. || 
|-id=434
| 13434 Adamquade ||  || Adam Robert Quade (born 1987), 2002 DCYSC finalist. He attended the St. John the Baptist School, New Brighton, Minnesota. || 
|-id=435
| 13435 Rohret ||  || Sasha Annalicia Rohret (born 1989), 2002 DCYSC finalist. She attended the Keystone Junior High School, San Antonio, Texas. || 
|-id=436
| 13436 Enid || 1999 WF || Enid, a city in northern Oklahoma. || 
|-id=437
| 13437 Wellton-Persson ||  || Helen Wellton (born 1961) and Claes Wellton Persson (born 1943) are Swedish entrepreneurs whose interest in minor planets and comets has resulted in generous support and sponsorship for the Uppsala-DLR Asteroid Survey. The name was suggested by G. Hahn. || 
|-id=438
| 13438 Marthanalexander ||  || Martha N. Alexander, 2001 DCYSC mentor. Alexander is a teacher at the All Saints Episcopal School, Lubbock, Texas. || 
|-id=439
| 13439 Frankiethomas || 2072 P-L || Frankie Thomas (1921–2006), an American actor who played cadet Tom Corbett in the 1950s TV series "Tom Corbett, Space Cadet". He was a fine role model for all children watching the show and believed that science was good and improved the quality of our lives. He had many movie credits before Tom Corbett. || 
|-id=441
| 13441 Janmerlin || 2098 P-L || Jan Merlin (born 1925), an American actor who played cadet Roger Manning in the 1950 TV series "Tom Corbett, Space Cadet". He was the astronavigator on the rocket ship's radar deck and was always on the lookout for asteroids and comets. || 
|-id=446
| 13446 Almarkim || 3087 P-L || Al Markim (1927–2015), an American actor who played cadet Astro in the 1950 TV series "Tom Corbett, Space Cadet". His role on the rocketship Polaris was to control the engines on the power deck. Besides acting in many early TV shows, he co-produced some early TV series. || 
|-id=448
| 13448 Edbryce || 4526 P-L || Ed Bryce (1921–1999), an American actor who played Captain Steve Strong in the 1950s TV series "Tom Corbett, Space Cadet". He led the crew of cadets. Ed Bryce contributed to the meteoric growth of early television and was featured in numerous shows. || 
|-id=449
| 13449 Margaretgarland || 4845 P-L || Margaret Garland (born 1921), an American actor who played Dr. Joan Dale in the 1950 TV series "Tom Corbett, Space Cadet". In one episode she went with the cadets to an asteroid mine. She appeared earlier in a number of Broadway plays and later became a nurse. || 
|-id=463
| 13463 Antiphos || 5159 T-2 || Antiphos, a friend of Telemachos and Odysseus and lived at Ithaca. || 
|-id=473
| 13473 Hokema || 1953 GJ || Peter Hokema (born 1955), a German violinist and maker of musical instruments. || 
|-id=474
| 13474 Vʹyus ||  || Yurij Sergeevich Vasilʹev (born 1929), rector of St. Petersburg State Technical University. || 
|-id=475
| 13475 Orestes || 1973 SX || Orestes, a son of Agamemnon, was a child at the time of the murder of his father. || 
|-id=477
| 13477 Utkin ||  || Vladimir Utkin (1923–2000), a Russian engineer and scientist, was the designer of numerous carrier rockets and spacecraft. He was chair of Russia's Advisory Expert Council, which conducted joint assessments of the safety of Shuttle-Mir missions together with the Thomas P. Stafford Council. || 
|-id=478
| 13478 Fraunhofer ||  || Joseph von Fraunhofer (1787–1826), a German autodidact, glassmaker, optician and scientist, had an uncommon talent. He improved the telescope, invented the diffraction grid, and measured the wavelengths of the absorption lines in the solar spectrum. In 1824 the Bavarian king elevated him to the nobility. || 
|-id=479
| 13479 Vet ||  || Vladimir Evgen'evich Tretyakov ("VET", born 1936), a Russian mathematician, is a co-author of the Repin-Tretyakov method for the stabilization of dynamical systems. As rector he provides unceasing support for the development of astronomy at the Ural University and for the annual Student Winter Astronomical School. || 
|-id=480
| 13480 Potapov ||  || Mikhail Mikhailovich Potapov (born 1904) is a distinctive Russian painter who made a series of icon works in the twelfth-century Byzantine manner for several temples. || 
|-id=482
| 13482 Igorfedorov ||  || Igor Borisovich Fedorov (born 1940) is a prominent scientist in the field of radio-wave propagation and over-the-horizon radar and is the author of more than 180 scientific publications. He has worked at the Bauman Moscow State Technical University since 1963 and has been rector since 1991. || 
|-id=488
| 13488 Savanov ||  || Igor Spartakovich Savanov (born 1956), the vice-director of the Crimean Astrophysical Observatory. || 
|-id=489
| 13489 Dmitrienko ||  || Elena Sergeevna Dmitrienko (born 1952), a senior researcher at the Crimean Astrophysical Observatory and wife of astronomer Igor' Savanov. || 
|-id=492
| 13492 Vitalijzakharov ||  || Vitalij Aleksandrovich Zakharov (born 1964) is an active surgeon-oncologist at the Simferopol cancer dispensary center. || 
|-id=493
| 13493 Lockwood || 1985 PT || George W. ("Wes") Lockwood (born 1941), an astronomer at Lowell Observatory since 1973, is an expert on high-precision photometry. Central to his research has been a decades-long study of the seasonal variability of Saturn VI (Titan), Uranus, and Neptune, as well as activity cycles in the sun and solar-type stars || 
|-id=494
| 13494 Treiso || 1985 RT || Treiso is a village near Alba, Piemonte. Each year, a day is set aside to celebrate both astronomy and the locally produced red wine, Barbaresco. The event is called "Tasting the Universe". The name was suggested by V. Zappalà and A. W. Harris || 
|-id=497
| 13497 Ronstone ||  || Ronald C. Stone (born 1946) joined the U.S. Naval Observatory in 1981, working in Washington D.C., in New Zealand and at Flagstaff Station in Arizona. He developed the Flagstaff Astrometric Scanning Transit Telescope (FASTT) and obtained extremely accurate positions for thousands of minor planets. || 
|-id=498
| 13498 Al Chwarizmi || 1986 PX || Al Chwarizmi (c.~780-c.~850), a Persian mathematician, astronomer and geographer. || 
|-id=499
| 13499 Steinberg ||  || Jean Louis Steinberg (born 1922) is a co-founder of the Nançay Radio Observatory and Astronomy and Astrophysics. He was among the first in France to launch space-astronomy missions using sounding rockets and satellites to study the physics of ionospheric plasma and the terrestrial magnetosphere. || 
|-id=500
| 13500 Viscardy || 1987 PM || Georges Viscardy (born 1917), the founder of the Société Monégasque d´Astronomie and of the Observatoire de Saint Martin de Peille on the French Riviera. || 
|}

13501–13600 

|-id=509
| 13509 Guayaquil ||  || Guayaquil, the largest and the most populated city in Ecuador || 
|-id=513
| 13513 Manila ||  || Manila, the capital of the Philippines, with a capital region of about 12 million inhabitants. || 
|-id=514
| 13514 Mikerudenko || 1990 MR || Michael Rudenko (born 1955) has been an IT specialist at the Minor Planet Center, handling the website and database, since 2009. He (co-)discovered three comets visually: C/1984 V1 (Levy-Rudenko); C/1987 Q1 (Rudenko); and C/1989 Q1 (Okazaki-Levy-Rudenko) || 
|-id=520
| 13520 Félicienrops ||  || Félicien Rops, Belgian painter || 
|-id=523
| 13523 Vanhassel ||  || André Vanhassel (born 1927) studied classical philology at Ghent University and philosophy at the Université libre de Bruxelles. He was the director of the Lyceum in Antwerp from 1980 to 1985. || 
|-id=525
| 13525 Paulledoux ||  || Paul Ledoux (1914–1988), was a Belgian astrophysicist, who was awarded the Francqui Prize for Exact Sciences in 1964. For his investigations into problems of stellar stability and variable stars he was awarded the Janssen Medal of the French Academy of Sciences in 1976. Name suggested by Jean Meeus. || 
|-id=526
| 13526 Libbrecht ||  || Ulrich Libbrecht (1928–2017), was a Belgian philosopher and authority in the field of Eastern and comparative philosophy. He studied sinology at the University of Ghent and became professor of sinology at the University of Leiden. His book With the Four Seas is a well-known introduction to comparative philosophy. || 
|-id=529
| 13529 Yokaboshi ||  || Yokaboshi is a local astronomical group established at Baloon Yoka Astronomical Observatory in 1992 in collaboration with the local government. || 
|-id=530
| 13530 Ninnemann ||  || Olaf Ninnemann (born 1947), German mathematician and leading expert in the field of information and documentation, is especially interested in number theory. He played a key role in the establishment of the Zentralblatt für Mathematik and has been its executive editor since 1978. || 
|-id=531
| 13531 Weizsäcker ||  || Carl Friedrich von Weizsäcker (1912–2007), German physicist and philosopher, was involved in nuclear physics, quantum theory and astronomy. Together with H. Bethe, he explained the radiation energy of stars by processes of nuclear fusion. He also developed a theory for the formation of the solar system. || 
|-id=533
| 13533 Junili ||  || June (1985), Nina (1987) and Lian (1988) daughters of psychologist Theo Geuens and Rita Heirman, both friends of the discoverer, Eric Walter Elst. They are majoring in sociology, mathematics and childhood education, respectively. || 
|-id=534
| 13534 Alain-Fournier ||  || Alain-Fournier (Henri-Alban Fournier, 1886–1914) was a French novelist and literary critic. In 1913 he published his novel Le Grand Meaulnes, which was widely admired and became a classic in French literature || 
|-id=540
| 13540 Kazukitakahashi ||  || Kazuki Takahashi (born 1997) is the eldest son of the first discoverer, Atsushi Takahashi. || 
|-id=543
| 13543 Butler ||  || John Christopher "Chris" Butler (born 1964), a prolific astronomical artist who has painted numerous scenes incorporating fine details and color in works like Apollo Dawn and a sense of humor reflected in such paintings as One Small Mistake for Man and Hooray for Hadleywood. || 
|-id=551
| 13551 Gadsden ||  || Michael Gadsden (1933–2003) worked during the International Geophysical Year on airglow and aurorae in New Zealand and Antarctica and later at Boulder and Aberdeen. He was an authority on noctilucent clouds and secretary general of the International Association of Geomagnetism and Aeronomy. || 
|-id=553
| 13553 Masaakikoyama || 1992 JE || Masaaki Koyama (born 1934), Japanese baseball player, was known for his superb ball control and was called "a precision throwing machine". Since retiring, he has been active as a coach, baseball commentator and critic. He was inducted into Japan's Baseball Hall of Fame in 2001. || 
|-id=554
| 13554 Decleir ||  || Hugo Decleir (born 1939) is Professor Emeritus in the geography department of the University of Brussels whose research interests include glaciology and climatology. He participated in several expeditions to Antarctica and is a co-founder of the International Polar Foundation || 
|-id=557
| 13557 Lievetruwant ||  || Godelieva Truwant (born 1948), a mathematics teacher at Institute Stella Matutina in Michelbeke, Belgium, has for more than 35 years been the encouraging supporter of the astronomical career of her husband, C. Sterken. || 
|-id=559
| 13559 Werth ||  || Hildegard Werth (born 1950), an experienced TV journalist with the large German TV system ZDF. || 
|-id=560
| 13560 La Pérouse ||  || Jean-François de Galaup, comte de Lapérouse (1741–1788), a French navigator sailed along the coast of South and North America and across the Pacific to China and Australia in 1785. In 1788, his ships L´Astrolabe and La Boussole vanished without a trace. The strait between Hokkaido and Sakhalin is named for him. || 
|-id=561
| 13561 Kudogou ||  || Gou Kudo (born 1954) is a high school science teacher and amateur astronomer. A director of the Kuroishi Subaru Association, he is also on the editorial staff of the association's magazine Starlit Sky Information and works vigorously to promote knowledge of astronomy || 
|-id=562
| 13562 Bobeggleton ||  || Bob Eggleton (born 1960) is a world-renowned artist whose work spans science, science fiction and fantasy. || 
|-id=564
| 13564 Kodomomiraikan ||  || Kodomomiraikan ("Museum of Future for Kids") is a hands-on-activity-based center for children that will open in 2010 in Edogawa, Tokyo. This facility will provide an opportunity for kids to continue to learn various subjects, including astronomy, the universe, manufacturing and nature || 
|-id=565
| 13565 Yotakanashi ||  || Yoichi Takanashi (born 1958) is an amateur astronomer and owner of a very famous Italian restaurant in Kamogawa City, and he entertains many a visitor coming to see him from Tokyo. He is also a vice director of the Kamogawa Lifesaving Club and contributes much to his community || 
|-id=567
| 13567 Urabe ||  || Mamoru Urabe (born 1960), a teacher of junior high school and an amateur astronomer, is a volunteer senior researcher at the Kamogawa Observatory in Chiba prefecture and has a private observatory in his home. His astronomical interests include comets, nebulae, star clusters and occultations by minor planets || 
|-id=569
| 13569 Oshu || 1993 EJ || Ōshū, a Japanese city is situated in the southern inland region of Iwate prefecture. It was formed on 2006 Feb. 20 as an amalgamation of five Japanese cities and towns. The Mizusawa Astrogeodynamics Observatory is located in the new city. || 
|-id=576
| 13576 Gotoyoshi || 1993 HW || Yoshihiro Goto (born 1955) is a local civil servant and a Japanese amateur astronomer. As a member of the secretariat of the Kuroishi Subaru Association, he is active in organizing star parties for amateur astronomers and lay persons || 
|-id=577
| 13577 Ukawa ||  || Hirohumi Ukawa (born 1942) mentored many an astronomical amateur and astronomy specialist by the time of his retirement from many years of distinguished services at the Takamatsu Municipal Planetarium. He also acted as the volunteer president of the Astronomical Society of Shikoku during his tenure || 
|-id=579
| 13579 Allodd ||  || The number of this minor planet consists of all odd digits, in increasing order. The name was suggested by Jean Meeus. || 
|-id=580
| 13580 de Saussure ||  || Swiss aristocrat and physicist Horace-Bénedict de Saussure (1770–1799) made several journeys through the Swiss Alps, directing his attention to its botany, mineralogy, geology and topography of the snowy mountains. This naming also honors the linguist Ferdinand de Saussure (1857–1913) || 
|-id=582
| 13582 Tominari ||  || Ichiro Tominari (born 1955), a prefectural government official, is also well known as an amateur astronomer in Oita. He began studying cosmic rays during his days as a university student and later became interested in galactic astronomy. He is now a planning director of the Astronomical Society of Oita || 
|-id=583
| 13583 Bosret ||  || Nicolas Bosret (1799–1876) was a blind composer and organist at the Cathedral St. Loup in Namur. In 1851 he composed Li Bia Bouquèt, which became the official hymn of the city. || 
|-id=585
| 13585 Justinsmith ||  || Justin E. H. Smith (born 1972) is an American-Canadian philosopher, at present a professor in the Department of Philosophy and Sciences at Diderot University, Paris. His recent book Nature, Human Nature and Human Difference (2015) is a collection of philosophical essays. || 
|-id=586
| 13586 Copenhagen ||  || Founded as a fishing village in the 10th century, Copenhagen became the capital of Denmark in the early 15th century. The name is derived from `merchants harbour'. Excavations have led to the discovery of a well from the late 12th century, and the remains of an ancient church, with graves dating from the 11th century. || 
|-id=599
| 13599 Lisbon ||  || One of the oldest cities in the world, Lisbon was inhabited by pre-Celtic tribes during the Neolithic period. In 711 the city was taken by Berbers and Arabs from North Africa and the Middle East. Muslim influences are still visible in the Alfama district that survived the 1755 Lisbon earthquake. || 
|}

13601–13700 

|-id=602
| 13602 Pierreboulez ||  || Pierre Boulez (1925-2016) was a French composer, conductor and pianist. As a child he showed a great aptitude for music and mathematics. He discovered the twelve-tone technique and wrote atonic music in a post-Weberian style. || 
|-id=605
| 13605 Nakamuraminoru || 1994 RV || Minoru Nakamura (born 1931) has been an active volunteer in the spread of astronomical knowledge and activities for children and youth since his retirement as principal of an elementary school in Kuroishi, Aomori prefecture. He has been president of the Kuroishi Subaru Association since 1992 || 
|-id=606
| 13606 Bean ||  || Alan Bean (1932–2018) an American astronaut, became the fourth person to set foot on the lunar surface during the Apollo 12 mission to Oceanus Procellarum. After leaving the space program, he had devoted himself to documenting his and his fellow astronauts' experiences through his spectacular artwork. || 
|-id=607
| 13607 Vicars ||  || Andrea Vicars (born 1974), an engineer with a wide range of skills. || 
|-id=608
| 13608 Andosatoru ||  || Satoru Ando (born 1954) has for many years been a passionate disseminator of astronomy as chairman of the Tateyama Astronomy Club in Chiba prefecture. He is also known as a beachcomber || 
|-id=609
| 13609 Lewicki ||  || Christopher A. Lewicki (born 1974), an engineer working at the Jet Propulsion Laboratory. || 
|-id=610
| 13610 Lilienthal ||  || Otto Lilienthal (1848–1896), a German engineer who explored the aerodynamics of the flight of birds. Beginning in 1891, he flew more than 2000 times with homemade gliders, with his last flight ending in a fatal crash. With his brother Gustav (1849–1933), he conducted experiments that provided important knowledge about flight. || 
|-id=615
| 13615 Manulis ||  || Ilan Manulis (born 1949) has enthusiastically promoted the study of near-earth objects from Israel and built awareness among the public by lectures and media programs. During the 1980s, he was chairman of the Israeli Astronomical Association. He now serves as IAA's head of small solar-system objects. || 
|-id=620
| 13620 Moynahan ||  || Dan Moynahan (born 1971), a computer programmer working at the University of Arizona's Lunar and Planetary Laboratory. || 
|-id=622
| 13622 McArthur ||  || Guy McArthur (born 1971), a talented programmer working at the University of Arizona's Lunar and Planetary Laboratory. || 
|-id=624
| 13624 Abeosamu ||  || Osamu Abe (born 1950), Japanese amateur astronomer and a researcher on snow and ice. || 
|-id=627
| 13627 Yukitamayo ||  || Tamayo Yuki (born 1956) joined the Fukuoka Astronomical Society and actively participates in their regular meetings. After her marriage, she built a private observatory in her back yard. She enjoys observing and photographing nebulae and star clusters through her 0.3-m Schmidt Cassegrain telescope || 
|-id=633
| 13633 Ivens ||  || John Ivens (born 1964), a computer programmer working at the University of Arizona's Lunar and Planetary Laboratory. || 
|-id=638
| 13638 Fiorenza ||  || Fiorenza Tombelli (born 1950), a sister of the first discoverer. || 
|-id=640
| 13640 Ohtateruaki ||  || Teruaki Ohta (born 1962) is a Japanese amateur astronomer and director of the Astronomical Society of Oita. His current main interests are comets, meteors, planetary occultations, lunar eclipses and solar eclipses. He also enjoys touring domestic and overseas astronomical observatories || 
|-id=641
| 13641 de Lesseps ||  || Jean-Baptiste de Lesseps (1766–1834), a French diplomat and writer, was a member of the scientific expedition of La Pérouse. Reaching the port of Avatcha (Kamchatka) on 1787 Sept. 30, he was transported over land by horses and sledges to get the reports of the voyage so far to Paris. This took him more than one year || 
|-id=642
| 13642 Ricci || 1996 HX || Gregorio Ricci-Curbastro (1853–1925), a professor of mathematics at the University of Padua. || 
|-id=643
| 13643 Takushi ||  || Takushi Yokota (born 1958), Japanese leader of the Kobe University astronomy club (see 13176 Kobedaitenken, above) and observing partner of the discoverer || 
|-id=644
| 13644 Lynnanderson ||  || Lynn Anderson (1947–2015), a multi-award-winning American country music singer, had a worldwide hit in 1970 with I Never Promised You a Rose Garden || 
|-id=647
| 13647 Rey ||  || Marc-Michel Rey (1720–1780) was a major figure in the publishing history of the Enlightenment in Amsterdam from 1744 onward. Manuscripts were smuggled out of France and found their way to Amsterdam, where they were printed and brought back to France clandestinely. || 
|-id=650
| 13650 Perimedes ||  || Perimedes from Greek mythology. He was the father of Schedius, the commander of the Phocians who was killed by Hector on the battlefield of Troy. || 
|-id=652
| 13652 Elowitz ||  || Mark Elowitz (born 1961) is a space scientist with a wide range of experience. He contributed to the Voyager survey of the outer solar system, the Magellan mission to Venus, Project LINEAR and the Galileo survey of the Jupiter system || 
|-id=653
| 13653 Priscus ||  || Tarquinius Priscus, fifth king of Rome, reigned from 616 to 579 B.C. He constructed the Circus Maximus and enlarged the Roman Forum || 
|-id=654
| 13654 Masuda ||  || Masuda is an area in Tanegashima, Kagoshima prefecture, where one can enjoy a great ocean view. The Masuda Tracking and Communication Station of the Japan Aerospace Exploration Agency is located on the cliff to conduct command operations and receive telemetry from satellites that observe the earth or the moon || 
|-id=657
| 13657 Badinter ||  || Elisabeth Badinter (Bleustein-Blanchet, b. 1944) is a French author, feminist and philosopher. Specializing in the eighteenth-century Enlightenment literature, she became famous for L´amour en plus (1980), where she defends the rights of women and proclaims the resemblances between men and women || 
|-id=658
| 13658 Sylvester || 1997 FB || James Joseph Sylvester (1814–1897) studied at Cambridge and was the founder, together with Cayley, of the theory of algebraic invariants. He taught at University College, London; at Johns Hopkins University (1877–1883), where he helped establish a graduate program in mathematics; and finally at Oxford || 
|-id=667
| 13667 Samthurman ||  || Sam Thurman (born 1961) led a team that helped develop the landing system for Mars Pathfinder that was key in proving that the landing approach would perform reliably on Mars. This used a Monte Carlo computer simulation that accurately modeled the spacecraft and its interaction with the Martian environment || 
|-id=668
| 13668 Tanner ||  || Roger Tanner (born 1950) has spent the last eight years at the University of Arizona's Lunar and Planetary Laboratory designing and building imaging systems for use on the various Mars missions, such as Mars Pathfinder, Beagle II and HiRISE. He is also an avid amateur astronomer who aspires to work at a professional level || 
|-id=669
| 13669 Swammerdam ||  || Jan Swammerdam (1637–1680), one of the first entomologists to use the microscope to study insects. || 
|-id=672
| 13672 Tarski || 1997 KH || Alfred Tarski (1901–1983), Polish logician, mathematician and philosopher, best known for his work on model theory, metamathematics, and algebraic logic || 
|-id=673
| 13673 Urysohn || 1997 LC || Pavel Samuilovich Urysohn (1898–1924), Russian mathematician mainly active in topology || 
|-id=674
| 13674 Bourge ||  || Pierre Bourge (born 1921) founded what was later to become the Association Française d´Astronomie in 1945, and its magazine Ciel et Espace in 1972. An avid solar eclipse observer and telescope maker, he has been an inspiration to a generation of astronomers, amateur and professional || 
|-id=677
| 13677 Alvin ||  || Alvin is a deep-sea submersible with a depth range of 4000 meters. Built in 1964, it was used for some of the greatest undersea adventures of all, including the recovery of a lost nuclear device, the mapping of the Mid-Ocean Ridge and the discovery of "black smoker chimneys" and associated tube worms || 
|-id=678
| 13678 Shimada ||  || Osamu Shimada (born 1914) is a professor emeritus in science at Yamagata University. He is now a researcher and instructor of science teaching || 
|-id=679
| 13679 Shinanogawa ||  || Shinanogawa is the river that flows from Nagano prefecture to Niigata prefecture and into the Sea of Japan. The longest river in Japan, it has a total length of 367 kilometers || 
|-id=680
| 13680 Katyafrantseva || 1997 PY || Ukrainian astronomer Kateryna ("Katya") Frantseva (born 1991) has advanced our understanding of how asteroids, comets and dust affect planetary surfaces in the Solar System and beyond. || 
|-id=681
| 13681 Monty Python ||  || Monty Python's Flying Circus, a comedy show starring Graham Chapman, John Cleese, Eric Idle, Michael Palin and Terry Jones, aired on the BBC from 1969 Oct. 5 to 1974 Dec. 5. It also featured animations by Terry Gilliam. || 
|-id=682
| 13682 Pressberger ||  || Rudolf Pressberger (1942–2001), an Austrian engineer and astronomer, invented an improved telescope fork mount, named the "Austria Mount". First released in 1986, it features a right-ascension axis built inside the fork, works without ball bearings and uses friction drives. Using this design, Pressberger also built a 1.0-m Ritchey-Chrétien telescope himself. || 
|-id=684
| 13684 Borbona ||  || Borbona is a picturesque town in the Italian region Lazio, famous for works of art that include a twelfth-century cross in gold and silver || 
|-id=686
| 13686 Kongozan ||  || Kongozan mountain (height 583 meters) is located in the east of Shirataka town, Yamagata prefecture. The mountain is in the discoverer's hometown || 
|-id=688
| 13688 Oklahoma ||  || Oklahoma is a U.S. state, and this was the first minor planet to be discovered from an observatory there. || 
|-id=689
| 13689 Succi ||  || Carlo Succi (1919–2000), was an Italian professor of physics at the University of Milan, was also director of the local section of the Istituto Nazionale di Fisica Nucleare. His interests ranged from a pioneering study of cosmic rays to the development of the Milan 50-MeV cyclotron. || 
|-id=690
| 13690 Lesleymartin ||  || Lesley and Martin Goldsmith took care of the discoverer, Thierry Pauwels, after he had an accident in Savernake Forest, Wiltshire, England || 
|-id=691
| 13691 Akie ||  || Akie Asami (born 1957) is the wife of the discoverer, Atsuo Asami. || 
|-id=693
| 13693 Bondar ||  || Roberta Bondar (born 1945), selected as a Canadian astronaut in 1983, flew on space shuttle mission STS-42 and has inspired the interest of young Canadians in science. || 
|-id=699
| 13699 Nickthomas ||  || Nicholas Thomas (born 1960), German scientist at Max Planck Institute for Solar System Research (Aeronomics), Katlenburg-Lindau, has been associated with obtaining close-up images of Solar System bodies, from his role on the Giotto multicolor camera, through the imager on Mars Pathfinder, to Rosetta's OSIRIS imager || 
|-id=700
| 13700 Connors ||  || Martin Connors (born 1954), a Canadian astronomer and associate professor at Athabasca University since 1996, was appointed Canada Research Chair in Space Science, Instrumentation and Networking in 2002. || 
|}

13701–13800 

|-
| 13701 Roquebrune || 1998 OR || Roquebrune-sur-Argens, Provençal village organizing a "Night of Stars" || 
|-id=703
| 13703 Romero ||  || Óscar Romero (1917–1980), was an archbishop in El Salvador. During his mission he actively denounced violations of the human rights of the most vulnerable populations and promoted opposition to all forms of violence. || 
|-id=704
| 13704 Aletesi ||  || Alessandro Tesi, is the younger son of the discoverer, the Italian amateur astronomer Luciano Tesi. || 
|-id=705
| 13705 Llapasset ||  || Jean-Marie Llapasset is a highly active French amateur astronomer. His main interest is the CCD observation of supernovae, and he is responsible for the coordination of measuring supernova magnitudes within the Association des Utilisateurs de Détecteurs Electroniques. || 
|-id=710
| 13710 Shridhar ||  || Nupur Shridhar (born 1989), 2002 DCYSC finalist. She attends the Great Valley Middle School, Malvern, Pennsylvania, || 
|-id=714
| 13714 Stainbrook ||  || Haileigh Kate Stainbrook (born 1989), 2002 DCYSC finalist. She attends the Fairmont Elementary, Sanger, California. || 
|-id=715
| 13715 Steed ||  || Jared Benjamin Steed (born 1988), 2002 DCYSC finalist. He attends the Buckeye Valley Middle School, Delaware, Ohio. || 
|-id=716
| 13716 Trevino ||  || Aron Michael Trevino (born 1990), 2002 DCYSC finalist. He attends the Jackson Middle School, San Antonio, Texas || 
|-id=717
| 13717 Vencill ||  || Kory Aaron Vencill (born 1988), 2002 DCYSC finalist. He attends the Applegate Middle School, Applegate, Oregon. || 
|-id=718
| 13718 Welcker ||  || Kelydra Elizabeth Welcker (born 1989), 2002 DCYSC finalist. She attends the Blennerhassett Junior High, Parkersburg, West Virginia || 
|-id=721
| 13721 Kevinwelsh ||  || Kevin William Welsh (born 1988), 2002 DCYSC finalist. He attended the St. Peter Chanel Interparochial School, Paulina, Louisiana. || 
|-id=722
| 13722 Campobagatin ||  || Adriano Campo Bagatin (born 1962), of the University of Bern, has worked on the observation of transneptunian objects, the collisional evolution of minor planets and the physics of small-body fragmentation processes. The name was suggested by P. Paolicchi || 
|-id=723
| 13723 Kolokolova ||  || Ludmilla Kolokolova (born 1951) is a scientist at the University of Florida, Gainesville. Her research centers on light scattering by particles and by the surfaces of solar-system bodies. The name was suggested by H. Scholl || 
|-id=724
| 13724 Schwehm ||  || Gerhard Schwehm (born 1949), a German physicist and head of the Planetary Missions Division of ESA-ESTEC, Noordwijk, and Project Scientist for the Rosetta Mission. He has worked mainly on the dynamical and physical properties of interplanetary dust particles. The name was suggested by H. Scholl. || 
|-id=729
| 13729 Nicolewen ||  || Nicole J. Wen (born 1989), 2002 DCYSC finalist. She attends the Keystone Junior High School, San Antonio, Texas. || 
|-id=730
| 13730 Willis ||  || Emily Kathleen Willis (born 1988), 2002 DCYSC finalist. She attends the Rocky Mountain Middle School, Heber, Utah. || 
|-id=732
| 13732 Woodall ||  || Ashley Renee Woodall (born 1987), 2002 DCYSC finalist. She attends the Austin Academy for Excellence, Garland, Texas. || 
|-id=733
| 13733 Dylanyoung ||  || Dylan Howard Young (born 1988), 2002 DCYSC finalist. He attended the Hastings Middle School, Upper Arlington, Ohio. || 
|-id=734
| 13734 Buklad ||  || Naomi Buklad, 2002 DCYSC mentor. She teaches at the Altamont School, Birmingham, Alabama. || 
|-id=739
| 13739 Nancyworden ||  || Nancy Worden, now retired, had a distinguished career as a technical librarian. She served as chief librarian at the U.S. National Solar Observatory. She began the use of computer-based databases in several U.S. government and commercial space programs. The citation was provided by her husband, S. P. Worden || 
|-id=740
| 13740 Lastrucci ||  || Liliana Lastrucci (born 1948) is wife of the second discoverer || 
|-id=743
| 13743 Rivkin ||  || Andrew S. Rivkin (born 1969), of the Massachusetts Institute of Technology, has wide-ranging interests, including 3- μ m observations of minor planets, Saturn's rings, stellar dust disks, science education, the moons of Mars and oblique impacts. He has also contributed to NEAR, Deep Space-1, ISO, MUSES-C and Rosetta. || 
|-id=744
| 13744 Rickline ||  || Rick Kline (born 1953) has been Data Manager of the Spacecraft Planetary Imaging Facility at Cornell University since 1987. Kline has provided imaging data for planetary and small body research, and has educated thousands of young space advocates in his educational outreach programs. The name was suggested by B. E. Clark || 
|-id=745
| 13745 Mikecosta ||  || Mike Costa (born 1954) is a Canadian amateur astronomer with wide-ranging observing interests, which he pursues with a 0.25-m Newtonian telescope. Costa has been an enthusiastic supporter of the activities of the Royal Astronomical Society of Canada, London Centre. || 
|-id=748
| 13748 Radaly ||  || Reginald Aldworth Daly (1871–1957), a Canadian geologist who was president of the Geological Society of America in 1932. He wrote on subjects such as the glacial control of coral reefs and rock mechanics. || 
|-id=750
| 13750 Mattdawson ||  || Matthew Dawson (born 1959), of Roeser, Luxembourg, is an active amateur involved in the astrometry of fast-moving NEOs using a 45-cm telescope. Dawson is also a musician who specializes in contemporary jazz and popular music. He recorded a hit song in Germany in 1991. The name was suggested by R. A. Kowalski || 
|-id=751
| 13751 Joelparker ||  || Joel W. Parker (born 1962), American astronomer and discoverer of minor planets. He works at the Southwest Research Institute, Boulder, Colorado, and specializes in the study of Kuiper belt objects. He is editor of the periodical Distant EKOs. || 
|-id=752
| 13752 Grantstokes ||  || Grant H. Stokes (born 1959) is principal investigator of the Lincoln Near-Earth Asteroid Research (LINEAR), the most prolific asteroid and comet discovery program, which is currently responsible for about 70% of all small bodies found worldwide || 
|-id=753
| 13753 Jennivirta ||  || Jenni V. Virtanen (born 1975), of the University of Helsinki, specializes in orbit determination. She has recently developed an initial orbit determination method, termed statistical ranging, suitable for use on poorly observed or short-arc objects. || 
|-id=760
| 13760 Rodriguez ||  || Maria Rodriguez mentored a finalist in the 2002 Discovery Channel Youth Science Challenge (DCYSC), a middle school science competition. She teaches at the Arvida Middle School, Miami, Florida || 
|-id=761
| 13761 Dorristaylor ||  || Dorris Taylor mentored a finalist in the 2002 Discovery Channel Youth Science Challenge (DCYSC), a middle school science competition. She teaches at the Dunbar Middle School, Fort Worth, Texas || 
|-id=764
| 13764 Mcalanis ||  || Edith McAlanis mentored a finalist in the 2002 Discovery Channel Youth Science Challenge (DCYSC), a middle school science competition. She teaches at the Barbara Bush Middle School, San Antonio, Texas || 
|-id=765
| 13765 Nansmith ||  || Nancy Smith mentored a finalist in the 2002 Discovery Channel Youth Science Challenge (DCYSC), a middle school science competition. She teaches at the Harry F. Byrd Middle School, Richmond, Virginia || 
|-id=766
| 13766 Bonham ||  || Dan Bonham mentored a finalist in the 2002 Discovery Channel Youth Science Challenge (DCYSC), a middle school science competition. He teaches at the Hillsboro High School, Hillsboro, North Dakota || 
|-id=770
| 13770 Commerson ||  || Philibert Commerson (1727–1773) was a French naturalist, botanist and explorer. In 1764 he joined Bougainville on the frigate Boudeuse to circumnavigate the world. Near Rio de Janeiro he found a vivid colorful vine, which upon his suggestion was named Bougainvillea by the French botanist de Jussieu. || 
|-id=772
| 13772 Livius ||  || Livy (59 BC – AD 17), a Roman historian known for the 142 books of his Ab urbe condita ("From the Founding of the City"). Only Books 1–10 and 21–45 have survived. The famous defeat by Hannibal of the Roman forces under Flaminius at the battle of Trasimeno Lake is described in Book 22., Roman historian || 
|-id=774
| 13774 Spurný ||  || Pavel Spurný (born 1958), of the Astronomical Institute of the Academy of Sciences of the Czech Republic, leads the European Network for photographing bolides. He is well known for his work in meteor physics and astronomy and has published many precise trajectories and orbits of bolides. The name was suggested by Z. Ceplecha. || 
|-id=775
| 13775 Thébault ||  || Philippe Thébault (born 1969), French planetary scientist at Paris Observatory and expert on the dynamics of small Solar System bodies. He has worked on the planetesimal accretion of planetary systems and collisions in the Kuiper Belt. || 
|-id=777
| 13777 Cielobuio ||  || CieloBuio is the Italian association against light pollution. Cielobuio played a fundamental role in Lombardy to support the passage of a regional law, one of the most advanced in the world. Through its electronic mailing list, Cielobuio connects both amateur and professional astronomers. || 
|-id=787
| 13787 Nagaishi ||  || Nagaishi city, situated in the southern part of Yamagata prefecture, has a population of 30~000 and is famous for its White azalea Park and Iris Park || 
|-id=788
| 13788 Dansolander ||  || Daniel Solander (1733–1782), a Swedish botanist, who joined James Cook on the Endeavour, the ship that was sent by the Royal Society to the South Seas to observe the June 1769 transit of Venus. During this voyage he collected about a thousand different species of plants, none of which was then known in Europe. || 
|-id=792
| 13792 Kuščynskyj || 1998 VG || Taras Kuščynskyj (1932–1983) was a Czech photographer, known for his beautiful black-and-white images of the female form, including fine-art nude studies. || 
|-id=793
| 13793 Laubernasconi ||  || Laurent Bernasconi (born 1966), French amateur astronomer, has collaborated with the Pises Observatory for many years. He has built several CCD cameras and automated telescope control systems, used by many amateurs in France. A fine observer, he has also discovered several minor planets using automated means. || 
|-id=798
| 13798 Cecchini ||  || Vasco Cecchini (born 1932), an Italian amateur astronomer who has collaborated with the Pian dei Termini Observatory. || 
|}

13801–13900 

|-
| 13801 Kohlhase ||  || Charles Kohlhase (born 1935), an American aerospace engineer has been a pioneer in the design, development and execution of planetary missions for more than four decades at the Jet Propulsion Laboratory. He twice received NASA's Outstanding Leadership Medal for the epic Voyager Grand Tour mission to the outer planets. || 
|-id=804
| 13804 Hrazany || 1998 XK || Hrazany, a Czech village, is the site of an ancient Celtic town in central Bohemia above the Vltava river in a gold-mining region. With an area of about 75 acres, it was settled in the second century B.C. and was destroyed in the first century A.D.. || 
|-id=806
| 13806 Darmstrong ||  || Dale Henry Armstrong (born 1962), is a Canadian amateur astronomer and high-school geography teacher with keen observing skills. || 
|-id=808
| 13808 Davewilliams ||  || Dafydd Williams (born 1954), a Canadian astronaut who flew on space shuttle mission STS-90 after being selected in 1992. As a physician, he has focused on medical aspects of space flight. || 
|-id=815
| 13815 Furuya ||  || Kazuko Furuya (born 1954) has devoted herself to kindergarten education since 1975. At present she is making efforts to give great dreams and hope to children with a creative teaching method, in the position of vice principal at Hadano Municipal Honcho kindergarten in Kanagawa prefecture || 
|-id=816
| 13816 Stülpner ||  || Karl Stülpner (1762–1841), a popular hero of Germany's Ore Mountains, lived in Scharfenstein, near Drebach. He and his group of hunters wandered through the Saxonian and Bohemian Ore mountains providing order and justice and helping those in need. || 
|-id=817
| 13817 Genobechetti ||  || Geno Bechetti (b.~1958) was a telescope operator at Steward Observatory's Bok Telescope and at the Large Binocular Telescope. He was also a member of mountain operations support at the observatory's Mt. Lemmon Station. He is an avid motorcyclist, logging over 300 thousand miles touring the United States || 
|-id=818
| 13818 Ullery ||  || Elaine Ullery mentored a finalist in the 2002 Discovery Channel Youth Science Challenge (DCYSC), a middle school science competition. She teaches at the Pinedale Middle School, Pinedale, Wyoming || 
|-id=820
| 13820 Schwartz || 1999 VQ || Michael Schwartz (born 1950) contributes to professional-amateur cooperative discovery and measurement of supernovae and efforts in improving automated astronomy at Tenagra Observatory in Patagonia, Arizona || 
|-id=822
| 13822 Stevedodson ||  || Steve Dodson (born 1943), a Canadian amateur astronomer, taught high school in northern Ontario. From 1982 to 1992 he was on the staff at Science North in Sudbury. Beginning in 1994, he made thousands of small "Stargazer Steve" telescopes. || 
|-id=824
| 13824 Kramlik ||  || Thomas Kramlik mentored a finalist in the 2002 Discovery Channel Youth Science Challenge (DCYSC), a middle school science competition. He teaches at the Penndale Middle School, Lansdale, Pennsylvania || 
|-id=825
| 13825 Booth ||  || Tempest Diane Booth mentored a finalist in the 2002 Discovery Channel Youth Science Challenge (DCYSC), a middle school science competition. She teaches at the Southside Fundamental Middle School, St. Petersburg, Florida || 
|-id=830
| 13830 ARLT ||  || The ARLT (Automatic Radio-Linked Telescope), a 0.44-m f/4.5 Newtonian located 40 km from Silver City, New Mexico, was one of the first remotely controlled automated CCD imaging facilities. Some 20~000 images obtained during 1991–1997 contributed to 22 publications or formal presentations || 
|-id=840
| 13840 Wayneanderson ||  || Wayne E. Anderson, 2001 DCYSC mentor. Anderson is a teacher at the House Junior High School, House, New Mexico || 
|-id=841
| 13841 Blankenship ||  || Paula A. Blankenship, 2001 DCYSC mentor. Blankenship is a teacher at the St. Michael Parish School, Wheeling, West Virginia || 
|-id=843
| 13843 Cowenbrown ||  || C. Owen Brown, 2001 DCYSC mentor. Brown is a teacher at the Alexandria Country Day School, Alexandria, Louisiana || 
|-id=845
| 13845 Jillburnett ||  || Jill M. Burnett, 2001 DCYSC mentor. Burnett is a teacher at the Canterbury School, Ft. Wayne, Indiana || 
|-id=848
| 13848 Cioffi ||  || Jessica Cioffi, 2001 DCYSC mentor. Cioffi is a teacher at the Oslo Middle School, Vero Beach, Florida. || 
|-id=849
| 13849 Dunn ||  || Deborah A. Dunn, 2001 DCYSC mentor. Dunn is a teacher at the Mesa Union Junior High School, Somis, California || 
|-id=850
| 13850 Erman ||  || Sister Dolores Erman, 2001 DCYSC mentor. Erman is a teacher at the Holy Name School, Sheridan, Wyoming || 
|-id=852
| 13852 Ford ||  || Ralph Ford, 2001 DCYSC mentor. Ford is a teacher at the Manhattan Beach Middle School, Manhattan Beach, California || 
|-id=853
| 13853 Jenniferfritz ||  || Jennifer K. Fritz, 2001 DCYSC mentor. Fritz is a teacher at the Landisville Middle School, Landisville, Pennsylvania || 
|-id=857
| 13857 Stafford ||  || Gregory Stafford (born 1963) is an electronics engineer at the University of Arizona's Steward Observatory. || 
|-id=858
| 13858 Ericchristensen ||  || Eric J. Christensen (born 1977), is an American astronomer and survey operations manager with Catalina Sky Survey. He has developed many novel tools to aid observers in validating the reality of moving objects flagged by CSS software, and created the catalog of stationary objects used by the Catalina Real time Transient Survey to identify optical transients. He is credited with the discovery of several comets. || 
|-id=859
| 13859 Fredtreasure ||  || Fred Treasure (born 1943) designed and built the wireless network and codeveloped the control system for the ARLT (Automatic Radio-Linked Telescope), one of the first completely automated remotely controlled CCD imaging facilities || 
|-id=860
| 13860 Neely ||  || A. W. Neely (born 1951) codesigned, constructed and operated one of the first completely automated remotely controlled CCD imaging facilities, the ARLT (Automatic Radio-Linked Telescope), which collected 20~000 CCD images during 1991–1997 || 
|-id=862
| 13862 Elais ||  || Elais, from Greek mythology. She was a daughter of Anius with the power to change berries into olive oil. She and her two sisters, Oeno and Spermo, who had the power to make wine and wheat, helped stock Agamemnon's fleet on their way to Troy and were turned into doves to escape being kidnapped by the Greeks. || 
|-id=868
| 13868 Catalonia ||  || Catalonia is an autonomous region in northeastern Spain bordered by the Mediterranean Sea, France and the regions of Aragon and the Valencian community. The Piera Observatory is located some 50 km northwest of the capital, Barcelona. || 
|-id=869
| 13869 Fruge ||  || Norma A. Fruge, 2001 DCYSC mentor. Fruge is a teacher at the F. K. White Middle School, Lake Charles, Louisiana || 
|-id=880
| 13880 Wayneclark || 6607 P-L || Wayne Clark (born 1942) has observed 288 lunar occultations and one minor-planet occultation, and has made some 3200 variable-star observations. || 
|-id=895
| 13895 Letkasagjonica || 2168 T-2 || Anna Leticia Rosales Chase (born 1998), Agustin Rosales Chase (born 2000), Kassia Elizabeth Rosales Chase (born 2002), John Arthur Rosales Chase (born 2004), and Nicolas Rosales Chase (born 2007), family friends who are homeschooled by Daniel W. E. Green, who made the identifications for this minor planet. || 
|-id=897
| 13897 Vesuvius || 4216 T-2 || Mount Vesuvius, near Naples, Italy, is the famous volcano that destroyed the cities Pompeii and Herculanum in 79 A.D. Large eruptions followed in 1631 and 1944. || 
|}

13901–14000 

|-id=904
| 13904 Univinnitsa ||  || Founded in 1912, the Vinnitsa Pedagogical University has played a great role in the training of teachers for primary and secondary schools in the Podoliya region of Ukraine. || 
|-id=906
| 13906 Shunda ||  || Nikifor Nikolaevich Shunda (born 1932), a mathematician. || 
|-id=908
| 13908 Wölbern ||  || Ingo Wölbern (born 1970) is a German geophysicist who has investigated the nature of the Hawaiian mantle plume and the Scandinavian shield by seismological methods. || 
|-id=911
| 13911 Stempels ||  || Eric Stempels (born 1974) is an astronomer at Uppsala University. He operates a meteor camera and is largely involved in outreach activities. || 
|-id=912
| 13912 Gammelgarn ||  || Gammelgarn, a small parish on Gotland, Sweden. Here can be found a well preserved defensive tower close to the old church. || 
|-id=914
| 13914 Galegant ||  || Gale D. Gant (born 1936), American amateur astronomer who assisted in organizing the photographic glass plate archive of the 1.2-m Schmidt Oschin Telescope at Palomar Observatory. Active in a leadership role in the Mt. Wilson Observatory Association, he has also made significant contributions to the Mount Wilson Observatory in California. || 
|-id=915
| 13915 Yalow ||  || Rosalyn Yalow (born 1921), the first American woman (and second woman ever) to be awarded the Nobel Prize in physiology or medicine. || 
|-id=916
| 13916 Bernolák ||  || Anton Bernolák (1762–1813), a Catholic priest who codified the first form of the Slovak language. || 
|-id=917
| 13917 Correggia || 1984 EQ || Matteo Correggia (1962–2001), from the Roero region of Piemonte, was one of the most exceptional Italian winemakers. Though young, his extraordinary talent, passion and modesty won him the highest accolades from international wine experts. The name was suggested by the discoverer, A. W. Harris (JPL) and V. Zappalà. || 
|-id=918
| 13918 Tsukinada || 1984 QB || The sea off the town of Otsuki, Kochi prefecture, is well known for coral products. Underwater corals make the sea of Tsukinada appear pinkish. Its beauty attracts tourists and is also sung of in a folksong || 
|-id=920
| 13920 Montecorvino ||  || Montecorvino Rovella, a small Italian town east of Salerno, Campania, site of an amateur astronomical observatory || 
|-id=921
| 13921 Sgarbini || 1985 RP || Bruno Sgarbini (born 1957) directs the "G. C. Gloriosi" amateur astronomical observatory in Montecorvino Rovella, Campania. An ardent popularizer of astronomy, he is also the principal organizer of an annual international astronomy meeting. The citation is endorsed by A. W. Harris and V. Zappalà. || 
|-id=922
| 13922 Kremenia ||  || Vasilij Grigorievich Kremen' (born 1947), a member of the Ukrainian Academy of Sciences and president of the Ukrainian Academy of Pedagogical Sciences, is a scientist of history, philology and pedagogics. || 
|-id=923
| 13923 Peterhof ||  || Peterhof Palace, celebrating its 300th anniversary in 2005, was founded near St. Petersburg as a royal seaside summer residence. || 
|-id=926
| 13926 Berners-Lee || 1986 XT || Tim Berners-Lee (born 1955) is the creator of a hypertext program that evolved into the World Wide Web. He founded the World Wide Web Consortium (W3C) at the Massachusetts Institute of Technology. || 
|-id=927
| 13927 Grundy ||  || Arthur Francis Grundy (born 1928) taught mathematics at Emanuel School, London, from 1957 to 1993. The name is endorsed by T. Berners-Lee, who, along with the discoverer, profited from Grundy's skillful teaching. || 
|-id=928
| 13928 Aaronrogers || 1987 UT || Aaron Rogers (1905–1989) taught mathematics at Emanuel School, London, from 1937 to 1970. His kindness to the discoverer exemplified a caring man of strong character. || 
|-id=930
| 13930 Tashko ||  || Tashko Vulchev (1970–1999) was a highly talented young astronomer-scientist at the Bulgarian National Astronomical Observatory. He died tragically shortly before the presentation of his Ph.D. thesis on the variability and structure of the stellar wind in the luminous massive stars || 
|-id=932
| 13932 Rupprecht ||  || Gero Rupprecht (born 1954) was a German astronomer at the European Southern Observatory from 1988 until 2019. He has been an integral part of astronomical instrumentation projects (FORS, HARPS and MUSE) that enabled the community to make numerous astronomical discoveries. || 
|-id=933
| 13933 Charleville ||  || Charleville, Queensland, Australia, home of the Charleville Cosmos Centre || 
|-id=934
| 13934 Kannami ||  || Kannami, a town in Shizuoka prefecture, Japan. || 
|-id=937
| 13937 Roberthargraves || 1989 PU || Robert Bero Hargraves (born 1928), Princeton University professor of geosciences. || 
|-id=942
| 13942 Shiratakihime ||  || Some 1300 years ago, according to local legend, Princess Shirataki came to Kiryu from the imperial city of Kyoto. She brought with her the skills of sericulture and weaving. Textile weaving has become the principal industry of Kiryu || 
|-id=952
| 13952 Nykvist ||  || Sven Nykvist (1922–2006), a Swedish cinematographer.  || 
|-id=954
| 13954 Born ||  || Max Born, German mathematician and physicist. || 
|-id=956
| 13956 Banks ||  || Joseph Banks, British botanist || 
|-id=957
| 13957 NARIT ||  || The National Astronomical Research Institute of Thailand (NARIT) was established in 2004 to commemorate the life and work of King Mongkut the "Father of Thai Science" || 
|-id=962
| 13962 Delambre ||  || Jean Baptiste Joseph Delambre, French astronomer and mathematician || 
|-id=963
| 13963 Euphrates ||  || The Euphrates river flows through northern Syria and Iraq. At Al Qurnah the Tigris and Euphrates rivers come close together, forming the Tigris-Euphrates system. || 
|-id=964
| 13964 La Billardière ||  || Jacques-Julien Houtou de La Billardière, French naturalist, who participated in the search for the vanished La Pérouse || 
|-id=975
| 13975 Beatrixpotter ||  || Beatrix Potter (1866–1943) was an English writer, illustrator and natural scientist. Her books for children, e.g. The Tale of Peter Rabbit, that she illustrated with animals, made her famous. She was also highly respected for her studies and watercolors of mushrooms. || 
|-id=977
| 13977 Frisch ||  || Karl von Frisch, an Austrian ethologist who received the Nobel Prize in Physiology or Medicine in 1973. || 
|-id=978
| 13978 Hiwasa || 1992 JQ || Hiwasa, a Japanese coastal town in Tokushima prefecture. Its Ohama Beach is known for sea turtles coming ashore to lay eggs and has an aquarium specializing in sea turtles. || 
|-id=980
| 13980 Neuhauser || 1992 NS || Philipp D. Neuhauser (1930–2003), a key member of the Public Affairs Office at the Jet Propulsion Laboratory. || 
|-id=982
| 13982 Thunberg ||  || Carl Peter Thunberg (1743–1828), Swedish botanist, was one of the last pupils of Carl Linnaeus, is considered the greatest botanist of his time. In 1770 he joined Dutch botanists on a journey to Japan. In the Cape area of South Africa, he collected more than 3000 new species. He wrote the first guide to Japanese flora, which made him famous in Japan. || 
|-id=989
| 13989 Murikabushi || 1993 BG || Murikabushi ("a swarm of stars" in the Okinawa dialect) is the name of the 1.05-m infrared-optical telescope at the Ishigakijima Astronomical Observatory. || 
|-id=991
| 13991 Kenphillips ||  || Ken Phillips (born 1946), a solar physicist at the Rutherford Appleton Laboratory, works on the heating of the solar corona and x-ray spectroscopy and solar and stellar flares. || 
|-id=992
| 13992 Cesarebarbieri ||  || Cesare Barbieri (born 1942), an Italian astronomer at Padua University, responsible for the construction and scientific calibration of the Wide Angle Camera for the OSIRIS system of the cometary mission ROSETTA. || 
|-id=993
| 13993 Clemenssimmer ||  || Clemens Simmer (born 1954), a German meteorologist, works on radiative transport theory and remote sensing for meteorological applications. || 
|-id=994
| 13994 Tuominen ||  || Ilkka Tuominen, Finnish astronomer at University of Oulu, works on the solar cycle, late-type star activity and astrophysical magnetohydrodynamics. || 
|-id=995
| 13995 Tõravere ||  || Tõravere (Tartu), is a small village in Estonia, where the Tartu Observatory is located nearby. || 
|}

References 

013001-014000